"Tuff Act to Follow" is a song by British R&B group MN8. It was released in August 1996 as the lead single from their second album, Freaky. It peaked at number 15 on the UK Singles Chart and at number 43 in France.

Track listings
 CD 1 / 12"
 "Tuff Act To Follow" (Radio Mix) — 3:43
 "Tuff Act To Follow" (Silk & Doc's Tuff Mix) — 5:02
 "Tuff Act To Follow" (Silk's House Mix) — 8:01
 "Tuff Act To Follow" (Best Kept Secret Mix) — 3:53
 "Tuff Act To Follow" (M. Doc's Mix) — 3:42

 CD 2
 "Tuff Act To Follow" (Radio Mix) — 3:43
 "Magic Ride" — 4:34
 "I Promise" — 3:56
 "Tuff Act To Follow" (Album version) — 3:41

 Cassette single
 "Tuff Act To Follow" (Radio Mix) — 3:43
 "Magic Ride" — 4:34

Charts

References 

1996 singles
1996 songs
MN8 songs
Songs written by Simon Climie